Andrea Pavan (born 27 April 1989) is an Italian professional golfer who currently plays on the Challenge Tour. He has won twice on the European Tour, the 2018 D+D Real Czech Masters and the 2019 BMW International Open.

Amateur career
Pavan won the Italian Amateur Strokeplay Championship in 2005 at the age of 16, and subsequently opted to join the collegiate circuit in the USA. He spent four years studying at Texas A&M enjoying a successful career on the golf team, including winning a collegiate event in 2010 and being part of the team which won the 2009 NCAA Men's Golf Championship. He also enjoyed success in Europe, winning further events in his home country and finishing runner-up in the prestigious European Amateur.

Professional career
Pavan turned professional in 2010. Having failed to come through qualifying school for either the European or PGA Tours, he relied on invites to the second-tier Challenge Tour in 2011. A runner-up finish at the Kärnten Golf Open, where he had been the longtime leader, secured him full-time status at that level. He enjoyed further success, leading the Credit Suisse Challenge at the halfway stage before a final round 86, before claiming his first professional victory at the Norwegian Challenge. He won again at the season-end Challenge Tour Grand Final to secure his place on the European Tour for 2012.

Pavan has an unsuccessful first season on the European Tour, only making the cut in 8 tournaments. He returned to the Challenge Tour in 2013, winning twice in the Bad Griesbach Challenge Tour and the Open Blue Green Côtes d'Armor Bretagne. He led the Order of Merit and returned to the European Tour for 2014.

2014, Pavan's second season on the European Tour, was more successful with four top-10 finishes. He retained his playing rights for 2015 by finishing in the top-25 in the European Tour Q School at the end of the season. 2015 was again unsuccessful and he returned the Challenge Tour for 2016. Pavan played on the Challenge Tour in 2016 and 2017 before returning again to the main tour through the 2017 Q-School, where he tied for second place.

2018 was easily Pavan's best season on the European Tour. He had his first European Tour win at the 2018 D+D Real Czech Masters and finished 34th in the Order of Merit. In 2019, Pavan won the BMW International Open beating Matt Fitzpatrick at the second hole of a sudden-death playoff.

Amateur wins
2005 Italian Amateur Strokeplay Championship
2006 Italian Omnium
2007 Italian Amateur Strokeplay Championship
2010 John Burns Intercollegiate

Professional wins (7)

European Tour wins (2)

European Tour playoff record (1–0)

Challenge Tour wins (4)

Challenge Tour playoff record (1–0)

Other wins (1)
2006 Italian National Open

Results in major championships

CUT = missed the halfway cut

Results in World Golf Championships

"T" = Tied

Team appearances
Amateur

 European Boys' Team Championship (representing Italy): 2004, 2005, 2007

Jacques Léglise Trophy (representing the Continental of Europe): 2004, 2005 (winners), 2006 (winners)
European Youths' Team Championship (representing Italy): 2006
European Amateur Team Championship (representing Italy): 2008, 2009, 2010
Eisenhower Trophy (representing Italy): 2008, 2010
St Andrews Trophy (representing the Continent of Europe): 2008
Palmer Cup (representing Europe): 2009 (winners), 2010

Professional
World Cup (representing Italy): 2018

See also
2011 Challenge Tour graduates
2013 Challenge Tour graduates
2014 European Tour Qualifying School graduates
2017 European Tour Qualifying School graduates
List of golfers with most Challenge Tour wins

References

External links

Italian male golfers
Texas A&M Aggies men's golfers
European Tour golfers
Sportspeople from Rome
1989 births
Living people